Count Fritz Carl Louis Stackelberg (31 May 1899 – 18 November 1988) was a Swedish diplomat.

Early life
Stackelberg was born on 31 May 1899 in Stockholm, Sweden, the son of ryttmästare, count Adolf Stackelberg (1850–1906) and countess Charlotte Lewenhaupt (born 1861). He passed studentexamen in Linköping in 1917.

Career
Stackelberg attended the Royal Military Academy in Stockholm in 1919 and served as a second lieutenant in the Svea Artillery Regiment (A 1) from 1920 to 1922. Stackelberg received a Candidate of Law degree in Stockholm in 1925 before becoming an attaché at the Ministry for Foreign Affairs the year after. He served in Copenhagen, Bern, London, Vienna, Budapest and Belgrade from 1926 to 1930 and was lieutenant at the Svea Artillery Regiment's reserve from 1928 to 1929. Stackelberg was the Foreign Minister's private secretary from 1930 to 1932 and was second secretary at the Foreign Ministry in 1931 and in Oslo and Rouen in 1932.

He served as secretary in trade negotiations with Italy in 1935 and was first vice consul in London in 1935. Stackelberg was first legation secretary in Rome in 1938 and legation counsellor in 1940 and director at the Foreign Ministry the same year. He was representative at the trade negotiations with Italy and Finland from 1941 to 1945 and was head of delegation in the trade negotiations with Bulgaria in 1944 and was legation counsellor in Paris in 1944 and in Copenhagen in 1947. Stackelberg was representative at the trade negotiations with Denmark from 1947 to 1948 and was envoy in Caracas, Havana, Ciudad Trujillo and in Port-au-Prince from 1948 to 1953. He was chief of protocol from 1953 to 1956 and ambassador in Athens from 1956 to 1962 and in Bern from 1962 to 1965. After that, Stackelberg served in the central board of the International Red Cross from 1966 to 1979.

Personal life
In 1937, he married Marianne Schumacher (1915–1999), the daughter of lawyer Adolf Schumacher and Greta (née Lindström). He was the father of Claes-Erik (born 1938), Katarina (born 1939) and Madeleine (born 1948).

Awards and decorations

Swedish
  Commander of the Order of the Polar Star
 Knight of the Order of Saint John in Sweden
 Herald of the Orders of His Majesty the King

Foreign
  Grand Cross of the Order of Merit
  Grand Officer of the Order of Carlos Manuel de Céspedes
  Commander 1st Class of the Order of the Dannebrog
  Grand Officer of the Order of Menelik II
  Grand Knight's Cross with Star of the Order of the Falcon (22 April 1954)
  Grand Officer of the Order of Bolivar
  Commander of the Order of the Lion of Finland
  Commander of the Order of Saints Maurice and Lazarus
 Commander of the Order of the Golden Star of China 
  Commander of the Royal Victorian Order
  Knight 1st Class of the Order of the White Rose of Finland
  Officer of the Legion of Honour
 Officer of the Austrian Badge of Honor
 First Class of the Greek Red Cross of Badge of Honor with laurel wreath

References

1899 births
1988 deaths
Swedish counts
Ambassadors of Sweden to Venezuela
Ambassadors of Sweden to Cuba
Ambassadors of Sweden to the Dominican Republic
Ambassadors of Sweden to Haiti
Ambassadors of Sweden to Greece
Ambassadors of Sweden to Switzerland
People from Stockholm
Commanders of the Order of the Polar Star
Swedish Army officers
Recipients of orders, decorations, and medals of Ethiopia